The Capture of Kufra was part of the Allied Western Desert Campaign during the Second World War. Kufra is a group of oases in the Kufra District of south-eastern Cyrenaica in the Libyan Desert.

With some early assistance from the British Long Range Desert Group, Kufra was besieged from 31 January to 1 March 1941 by Free French forces which forced the surrender of the Italian and Libyan garrison.

Background
Kufra, in the Libyan Desert subregion of the Sahara, was an important trade and travel centre for the nomadic desert peoples of the region, including Berbers and Senussi. The Senussi made the oasis their capital at one point against British, Italian and French designs on the region. In 1931, the Kingdom of Italy captured Kufra and incorporated it into the Italian North Africa colonisation of the Maghreb. The Italian post at Kufra included the Buma airfield and radio station, used for air supply and communications with Italian East Africa and a fort at the nearby village of El Tag.

Prelude
After the Allied defeat of 1940 in the Battle of France, the colony of French Equatorial Africa (FEA) declared its allegiance to Free France, the government-in-exile led by Charles de Gaulle. Chad, the northern part of FEA, borders Libya. De Gaulle ordered the Free French in Chad to attack Italian positions in Libya.

Attacking Kufra would be very difficult for this motley. The Free French had very little motor transport and needed to cross  of desert, much of which was sand dune or the fine, powdery soil called  which was thought impassable to motor vehicles. The French received assistance from the British Long Range Desert Group (LRDG), a reconnaissance and raiding unit formed to operate behind the Italian lines, who had become expert in desert navigation. Major Pat Clayton of the LRDG was keen to join with the Free French to test the Italians. Clayton commanded G Guard (Brigade of Guards) and T Patrol (New Zealand) of the LRDG, comprising 76 men in 26 vehicles.

The LRDG and Free French first raided the Italian airfield at Murzuk, in the –Fezzan region in south-western Libya. D'Ornano and ten Free French (three officers, two sergeants and five local soldiers) met LRDG patrols on 6 January 1941 at Kayouge. The combined force reached Murzuk on 11 January and in a bold stroke, surprised the sentries and devastated the base. Most of the force attacked the main fort; a troop from T Patrol (Lieutenant Ballantyne) attacked the airfield, destroying three Caproni aircraft and taking some prisoners; D'Ornano was killed in the raid along with one trooper of T Patrol. A French officer with a leg wound cauterised it with a cigarette, much to the admiration of the LRDG. A diversionary raid by French camel cavalry failed after it was betrayed by local guides and these troops were relegated to reconnaissance.

Battle

Colonel Philippe Leclerc assumed command in place of d'Ornano. After the success of the Murzuk raid, Leclerc marshalled his forces to take on Kufra. The attacking column included about 400 men in sixty trucks, two Laffly S15 ( TOE) scout cars, four Laffly S15R cross country personnel carriers and two  mountain guns. Kufra was protected by two defensive lines around the El Tag fort with barbed wire, trenches, machine-guns and light anti-aircraft guns. The  in Kufra was around 120-men strong (45 Italians and 75 Libyans).

Leclerc asked the LRDG to deal with the Saharan company, based in El Tag fort in the Kufra oasis. The LRDG was detected by a radio intercept unit at Kufra and the Italians organised a mobile column of forty men, one AS37 and four FIAT 634 lorries to intercept them. G Patrol had been kept in reserve. On 31 January, Major Clayton was at Bishara ( south-south-west of Kufra) with T Patrol (30 men in 11 trucks). The patrol was spotted by an Italian aeroplane in the morning. T Patrol took cover in a small wadi at Gebel Sherif, a few kilometres north. The plane directed the Saharan patrol to attack the LRDG force. Due to the fire-power of the Italian vehicles, armed with  cannon, and constant air attack, T Patrol was driven off, losing four trucks and Major Clayton, who was captured with several others. Trooper Ronald Moore led other survivors to safety after a long foot march. The remaining LRDG force withdrew to Egypt for refitting, except for one vehicle of T Patrol, equipped for desert navigation.

Leclerc pressed on with his attack, even though the Italians had captured a copy of his plans from Major Clayton. After conducting further reconnaissance, Leclerc reorganised his forces on 16 February. He abandoned his two armoured cars and took with him the remaining serviceable artillery piece. Only about 350 men reached Kufra, due to breakdowns of trucks on the march. Aware of the French approach, the Italians organised another strong mobile column from the Saharan company (seventy men, ten AS37 and five trucks). The 75 mm gun was placed  from the fort, beyond range of the defenders and fired twenty shells per day at regular intervals from different places to give the appearance of more guns. Some  mortars were placed  from the fort and bombed the Italian positions to increase the pressure on the defenders.

Italian surrender
The fort was commanded by an inexperienced reserve captain, who lacked the will and the determination to fight. Surrender negotiations began on 28 February and on 1 March 1941, the Italian garrison of 11 officers, 18 NCOs and 273 Libyan soldiers (12, 47 and 273, according to French sources) surrendered El Tag and the Kufra oasis to the Free French. During the siege, the Italian garrison had suffered one Italian officer killed, two Libyan soldiers killed and four wounded; the French suffered four fatal casualties and 21 wounded. The Italian garrison was permitted to withdraw to the north-west and the French forces took over eight SPA AS.37  light trucks, six lorries, four 20 mm cannon and 53 machine-guns.

Orders of battle

French
 HQ: 1 Matford truck, 2 Chevrolet light trucks, 2 Bedford 1.5 ton trucks, 1 ER26bis radio
 1 reduced infantry company (Captain Rennepont): 23 Bedford 1.5 ton trucks
 2 platoons, GN Ennedi (Captain Barboten): 120 men, 1 Dodge truck, 16 Matford V8 3 ton trucks
 1 platoon, 7th Company, RTST (Captain Florentin): 60 men, 1 Dodge truck, 2 Matford V8 3 ton trucks
 Artillery platoon (Lieutenant Ceccaldi): 2 75 mm Mle1928 Schneider mountain guns, 4 Laffly S15 carriers, 1 Dodge truck, 2 Matford V8 3 ton trucks
 Armoured car detachment (Adjudant Detouche): 2 Laffly S15TOE, 1 Matford V8 3 ton truck, 1 ER26bis/39 radio

Italian
 HQ forces Settore Cufra (Kufra sector)
 59th : 3 officers, 1 NCO, 3 Italian enlisted, 110 colonial troops enlisted, 13 MG (8 mm Schwarzlose 07/12 or 6.5 mm FIAT mod. 14)
 60th : 3 officers, 1 NCO, 3 Italian enlisted, 110 colonial troops enlisted, 13 MG (8 mm Schwarzlose 07/12 or 6.5 mm FIAT mod. 14)
  (LT Caputo – KIA): 4 officers, 7 NCO, 32 Italian enlisted, 77 colonial troops enlisted, 16 AS 37 off-road vehicles, 4 FIAT 634 trucks
 : 4 officers, 4 NCO, 32 Italian enlisted, four aircraft

Oath of Kufra

After the fall of Kufra, Leclerc and his troops swore an oath to fight until "our flag flies over the Cathedral of Strasbourg"

The oath was fulfilled on 23 November 1944, when Leclerc and the French 2nd Armoured Division liberated Strasbourg.

See also

 North African campaign timeline
 List of French military equipment of World War II
 List of Italian military equipment in World War II
 List of British military equipment of World War II
 List of World War II Battles
 Sudan Defence Force
 Kufra District

Notes

Footnotes

References

Further reading

External links
 Peter McIntyre, Salt Lake at Kufra Oasis, 1941–1943 (Painting)
  Real location of Kayouge rendezvous

Conflicts in 1941
1941 in Libya
Western Desert campaign
Libya in World War II
Kufra District
Battles of World War II involving France
Battles of World War II involving Italy
Kufra